Stechelberg is a small village in Switzerland located at the base of the Schwarzmönch mountain in the Bernese Alps, part of the district of Lauterbrunnen.

History
The name "Stächelbärg" is first recorded in 1749 to describe this part of the valley. The area was associated with iron ore mining, which led to widespread deforestation. Since then, reforestation programmes have largely restored the area around the village, which has been declared a protected natural area (Naturschutzgebiet)

The village is connected by the Luftseilbahn Stechelberg-Mürren-Schilthorn (LSMS), an aerial tramway constructed in 1965, to other amenities and locations in the area.

In February 2003, two avalanches struck the village, but did not cause significant damage.

As of 2009, Stechelberg has 255 inhabitants.

Transport
Stechelberg is accessed by Lauterbrunnen from the terminal train station, or by a small road that leads up the valley from Lauterbrunnen. The only other way to reach the village is by hiking over difficult terrain.

External links
http://www.stechelberg.ch

Villages in the canton of Bern
Bernese Oberland